Laypeh (also Romanized as Lāypeh and Ley Peh; also known as Lāibeh, Lay Pahneh, Leybeh, Ley Paheh, and Līpaheh) is a village in Shabankareh Rural District, Shabankareh District, Dashtestan County, Bushehr Province, Iran. At the 2006 census, its population was 358, in 61 families.

References 

Populated places in Dashtestan County